Janet Bately  is a British academic, the Sir Israel Gollancz Professor Emerita of English Language and Medieval Literature at King's College London since 1977. She has a bachelor's degree from Somerville College, Oxford and began her academic career as a lecturer at Birkbeck College. Her research interests include Old English and Middle English literatures, the court of King Alfred the Great, and early modern bilingual dictionaries.

Recognition 
Bately was elected Fellow of the British Academy in 1990, and a CBE in 2000. She is an Honorary Fellow of Somerville College, Oxford. In 1997, Bately was honoured with a Festschrift, Alfred the Wise, edited by Jane Roberts, Janet L. Nelson, and Malcolm Godden to celebrate her 65th birthday.

Selected works 

 Bately, Janet M. "Old English Prose before and during the Reign of Alfred." Anglo-Saxon England 17 (1988): 93-138.
 Bately, Janet. "Did King Alfred actually translate anything? The integrity of the Alfredian canon revisited." Medium Ævum 78.2 (2009): 189-215.
 Bately, Janet M. The Literary Prose of King Alfred's Reign: Translation or Transformation?. Routledge, 2019.
 Bately, Janet M. "The Old English Orosius." A Companion to Alfred the Great. Brill, 2015. 297-343.
 Bately, Janet. "BILINGUAL AND MULTILINGUAL DICTIONARIES OF THE RENAISSANCE AND EARLY SEVENTEENTH CENTURY1." The Oxford history of English lexicography 1 (2008): 41-64.

References

Living people
Academics of King's College London
Fellows of the British Academy
Commanders of the Order of the British Empire
Alumni of Somerville College, Oxford
Fellows of Somerville College, Oxford
Year of birth missing (living people)
Fellows of King's College London